Neuontobotrys is a genus of flowering plants belonging to the family Brassicaceae.

Its native range is Peru to Southern South America.

Species:

Neuontobotrys amplexicaulis 
Neuontobotrys berningeri 
Neuontobotrys camanaensis 
Neuontobotrys choiquensis 
Neuontobotrys elloanensis 
Neuontobotrys frutescens 
Neuontobotrys intricatissimus 
Neuontobotrys lanatus 
Neuontobotrys linearifolius 
Neuontobotrys mendocinus 
Neuontobotrys polyphyllus 
Neuontobotrys robustus 
Neuontobotrys schulzii 
Neuontobotrys tarapacanus

References

Brassicaceae
Brassicaceae genera